Undine is an unincorporated community in Evans County, in the U.S. state of Georgia.

History
The first permanent settlement at Undine was made in the early 1900s. A post office called Undine was established in 1900, and remained in operation until 1907.

References

Unincorporated communities in Georgia (U.S. state)
Unincorporated communities in Evans County, Georgia